Beatton River Provincial Park is a provincial park in the Peace River Country of northeastern British Columbia, Canada.

See also
Beatton Provincial Park
Beatton River

External links

Peace River Country
Provincial parks of British Columbia
Year of establishment missing